Chag may refer to:

 Christian Health Association of Ghana (CHAG)
 Chag (Jewish holiday), (חג in Hebrew, plural: Chagim) the transliteration from Hebrew meaning "holiday"
 Niraj Chag (born 1976), London-based musical artist and composer

See also
Chaga people, a sub-group in Tanzania